Sibanicú is a municipality and town in the Camagüey Province of Cuba.

Demographics
In 2004, the municipality of Sibanicú had a population of 31,117.

See also
Sibanicú Municipal Museum
List of cities in Cuba
Municipalities of Cuba

References

External links

Populated places in Camagüey Province